The name Wiedergänger refers to different zombie or ghost phenomena from different cultural areas. The word means "one who walks again" in German. The core of the wiedergänger myth is the concept of the deceased, who—often in the form of a physical phenomenon—return to the world of the living. They usually cause problems and frighten living people. They exist either to avenge some injustice they experienced while alive, or because their soul is not ready to be released, as a consequence of their former way of life.

German beliefs 
In different parts of Germany, until the early 20th century, the belief was common that dead ones lived on, after their death, and exerted a disastrous influence from the grave. This influence was believed to be partly done via a telepathic effect (sympathy charm), so that the nachzehrer, as the villain was called, did not need to rise from the grave and still could suck the vitality from living persons with his open mouth, his open eye and by gnawing on the burial shroud. Other undead, in the belief of the people, rose from the graves and jumped on the back of night ramblers. This Aufhocker could assume different shapes, for example in the Rhineland, the form of the werewolf. The humans had to carry him, frequently as far as to the wall of the churchyard or to the place where the body was buried. The aufhocker (also called "huckop" or "huckupp") became ever more heavy, and the victim would finally break down exhausted or dead. In some legends, the troubled humans succeeded in banishing or redeeming the villain by a spell or a prayer. Especially in the areas marked by Catholicism the belief of the up-squatting wiedergänger merged with the belief of the soul, so that folklorists around 1920 had considerable difficulties to separate a belief in ghosts from the old nuclear belief of the undead wiedergänger. The Aufhocker after all could, according to the tradition, not be a ghost, because he had a tangible body, which also increased in weight from step to step, which would not have been possible for an immaterial spirit. Another form of the physical wiedergänger is the headless rider that, frequently mentioned in West German legends, entered into world literature and even into the history of film through the American poet Washington Irving and his novel The Legend of Sleepy Hollow.

Nordic mythology

In the sagas, wiedergänger in the form of draugar are a frequent motif. This occurs, for example, in the Hrómundar saga Gripssonar or in the Laxdœla saga. Whoever met a wiedergänger is often threatened by imminent death. Remarkable here is the stress on the physicality of the wiedergänger, which on the one hand shows in its superhuman power, but on the other hand, in its vulnerability: draugar can be killed by decapitation.

Literature 
 Augustin Calmet: Gelehrte Verhandlung der Materie von den Erscheinungen der Geister, und der Vampire in Ungarn und Mähren. Edition Roter Drache, 2007.  Scholarly negotiation of the subject of the apparitions of the spirits, and the Vampires in Hungary and Mähren
 Peter Kremer: Draculas Vettern. Auf der Suche nach den Spuren des Vampirglaubens in Deutschland. Düren 2005 Dracula's cousins. Searching for the traces of the Vampire-belief in Germany.
 Erwin Rudolf Lange: Sterben und Begräbnis im Volksglauben zwischen Weichsel und Memel. (Phil. Diss.) Würzburg 1955 (numerous information about wiedergänger-belief in the east of the Deutsche Reich) Dying and funeral in folk belief between Weichsel and Memel.
 Claude Lecouteux: Geschichte der Gespenster und Wiedergänger im Mittelalter. Böhlau, Köln 1987,   History of the ghosts and wiedergänger in the Middle Ages.
 Michael Ranft, Nicolaus Equiamicus: Traktat von dem Kauen und Schmatzen der Toten in Gräbern. 1734, German translation from Latin 2006 in the  UBooks-Verlag.  Treatise of the chewing and smacking of the dead ones in graves.
 Matthias Schulz: Sumpf der Vampire. Eine in Niedersachsen entdeckte Moorleiche ist über 2600 Jahre alt. Forscher bereiten Hightech-Untersuchungen vor. Hauptfrage: Warum wurden so viele Mumien verstümmelt und angepflockt?, In: Der Spiegel. 27. Juni 2005 Swamp of the vampires. A moorland corpse discovered in Lower Saxony is over 2600 years old. Researchers prepare hightech investigations. Main question: Why were so many mummies mutilated and impaled?
 Thomas Schürmann: Der Nachzehrerglauben in Mitteleuropa. Marburg 1990 The Nachzehrer-belief in middle Europe
 A. Silberschmidt: Von den blutsaugenden Toten. Oder philosophische Schriften der Aufklärung zum Vampirismus. Hexenmond-Verlag, 2006,  'About the bloodsucking dead. Or philosophical writings of the Enlightenment about vampirism.''

See also
 Jiangshi
 Revenant (folklore)
 Zombie

References 
 Annett Stülzebach: Vampir- und Wiedergängererscheinungen aus volkskundlicher und archäologischer Sicht, In: Concilium medii aevi, 1/1998, page 97-121
 The Walking Dead: draugr and Aptrgangr in old Norse Literature

Corporeal undead
German legendary creatures
Ghosts